Kano: An American and His Harem is a 2010 Philippine independent documentary film written and directed by Monster Jimenez. The film premiered at the 2010 International Documentary Festival Amsterdam, where it won Best First Appearance. It won the best Documentary Award at the 2010 Cinemanila International Film Festival and the 2011 Gawad Urian Awards.

See also 
 Monster Jimenez
 Apocalypse Child

References

External links
 

2010 films
Films by Monster Jimenez
Philippine independent films
Philippine New Wave